The shield-tailed agama (Xenagama taylori), also known commonly as the dwarf shield-tailed agama, Taylor's strange agama, and the turnip-tailed agama, is a species of lizard in the family Agamidae. The species is endemic to the Horn of Africa.

Etymology
The specific name, taylori, is in honor of British army officer Captain R. H. R. Taylor.

Geographic range
X. taylori is found in eastern Ethiopia and Somalia.

Reproduction 
X. taylori is oviparous.

Habitat
X. taylori lives on arid, flat land, sometimes on hilly landscapes, sandy but also hard grounds, where it digs deep galleries.

Description
Adults of X. taylori are less than 10 cm (4 inches) in total length (including tail), and hatchlings are just over a centimeter (3/8 inch) and weigh only 3 grams (0.11 ounce).

Defensive behavior
Like most other Xenagama species, X. taylori will shelter within self-made burrows and use the whorl-like, heavily built tail to close the burrow to evade predators.

Diet
Being a small lizard, X. taylori is essentially insectivorous, but has been seen to eat grasses, fruits, and berries.

Sexual dimorphism
X. taylori is sexually dimorphic. Sexually mature males display a breeding coloration of vibrant blue on the throat for a short time of the year. Mature males possess larger femoral pores enclosed by a waxy pheromonal yellow substance.

References

Further reading
Largen M, Spawls S (2010). Amphibians and Reptiles of Ethiopia and Eritrea. Frankfurt am Main: Edition Chimaira / Serpents Tale. 694 pp. .
Mazuch T (2013). Amphibians and Reptiles of Somaliland and Eastern Ethiopia. Dřiteč, Czech Republic: Tomáš Mazuch Publishing. 80 pp. .
Parker HW (1935). "Two new Lizards from Somaliland". Annals and Magazine of Natural History, Tenth Series 16: 525–529. {"Agama (Xenagama) taylori ", new species, p. 525}. 
Flannery, Tim; Schouten, Peter (2004). Astonishing Animals: Extraordinary Creatures and the Fantastic Worlds They Inhabit. New York: Atlantic Monthly Press. (Xenagama taylori, p. 130).

Xenagama
Reptiles of Somalia
Reptiles described in 1935
Taxa named by Hampton Wildman Parker